Chailly-en-Brie Aerodrome was a temporary World War I airfield in France.  It was located  East of Chailly-en-Brie, in the Seine-et-Marne department in the Île-de-France region near Paris.

Overview
The airfield was a temporary facility built during the Second Battle of the Marne, likely consisting of no more than a few tents, used by both American and French units until end of August after the Allied counter-offensive liberated the area. It was used by the I Corps Observation Group as its headquarter, 12–22 August, with its two squadrons, 1st Aero Squadron and 12th Aero Squadron, operating from the airfield during the same time. The whole group then flew to Croix de Metz Aerodrome in Lorraine to prepare for the next push.

For the same reason of the battle front quickly moving towards NE, the French escadrilles stationed at Chailly left before the end of August, and the fields were soon returned to agricultural use.

The airfield was located 1.3 miles of Chailly, between the main road and the hamlet of Couture; no indications of its wartime use remain today.

See also

 List of Air Service American Expeditionary Force aerodromes in France

References

 Series "D", Volume 2, Squadron histories,. Gorrell's History of the American Expeditionary Forces Air Service, 1917–1919, National Archives, Washington, D.C.

External links

World War I sites of the United States
World War I airfields in France